Key dates in the History of Somerset
43–47 – Roman invasion and occupation
491 – Battle of Mons Badonicus (may have been fought in Somerset) (uncertain date)
537 – Battle of Camlann (sometimes located at Queen Camel) (uncertain date)
577 – Battle of Deorham (Dyrham, Gloucestershire) – Saxons occupied Bath
658 – Battle of Peonnum (Penselwood ?) – Saxons then occupied most of Somerset
710 – Battle of Llongborth (? Langport)
845 – First documentary reference to "Somersæte"
878 – Battle of Cynwit – Saxon victory over the Danes by Ealdorman Odda
878 – Battle of Ethandun – West Saxon victory over the Danes (uncertain whether in Somerset or Wiltshire)
878 – Treaty of Wedmore – after defeat of Danes by King Alfred the Great
c900 – Kings of Wessex hold court at Cheddar
973 – King Edgar of England crowned at Bath
988 – St Dunstan buried at Glastonbury
1013 – Danish king Sweyn Forkbeard received submission of western thegns at Bath
1088 – Siege of Ilchester
1191 – Discovery of "King Arthur's" tomb at Glastonbury
1497 – Perkin Warbeck's rebellion supported by Somerset men
1643 – Battle of Lansdowne
1645 – Siege of Taunton during the English Civil War
1685 – Battle of Sedgemoor – Duke of Monmouth defeated
1685 – Judge Jeffries holds the "Bloody Assizes" at Taunton
1770 – Start of major enclosures of Somerset Levels
1805 – Somerset Coal Canal Opened
1827 – Bridgwater and Taunton Canal opened
1875 – Formation of Somerset County Cricket Club
1898 – County boundaries altered
1956 – Chew Valley Lake opened by Queen Elizabeth II
1974 – Formation of County of Avon, reducing the area of the County of Somerset
1996 – Abolition of the County of Avon, creating the unitary authorities of North Somerset and Bath and North East Somerset

 
Somerset